This is a list of indigenous rights organizations. Some of these organizations are members of other organizations listed in this article. Sometimes local organizations associated with particular groups of indigenous people will join in a regional or national organization, which in turn can join an even higher organization, along with other member supraorganizations.

The "International" section is for organizations that are open to work with indigenous peoples around the world. These organizations are not limited to a specific area or with specific Indigenous Peoples. They are listed by country of origin. The organizations in the "Regional" section are listed by the area in which they work. The regions and countries in this part of the list indicate the area in which these organizations operate.

International

Denmark

International Work Group for Indigenous Affairs (IWGIA)

Germany

Friends of Peoples Close to Nature (fPcN)

Netherlands

FERN
Global Forest Coalition (GFC)

Switzerland

International Committee for the Indians of America (Incomindios Switzerland)

United Kingdom

Forest Peoples Programme (FPP)
Minority Rights Group International (MRG)
Rainforest Foundation UK
Survival International

Turkey
KAFFED

United States

Amazon Conservation Team (ACT)
Amazon Watch
Center for International Environmental Law (CIEL)
Center for World Indigenous Studies (CWIS)
Cultural Survival
Indigenous Peoples Council on Biocolonialism (IPCB)
Indigenous Peoples Law and Policy Program (IPLP)
International Indian Treaty Council (IITC)
Mexica Movement
Rainforest Foundation US
Rights and Resources Initiative (RRI)
Terralingua

Uruguay

World Rainforest Movement (WRM)

Regional

Regions

Africa

Indigenous Peoples of Africa Co-ordinating Committee (IPACC)

Amazon Basin

Coordinator of Indigenous Organizations of the Amazon River Basin (COICA)

Americas

Arctic
Free Buryatia Foundation (FBF)
Hokkaido Utari Association
Inuit Circumpolar Council (ICC)
Saami Council

Europe
Mejlis of the Crimean Tatar People

Asia
Asia Indigenous Peoples Pact
Boycott, Divestment and Sanctions (BDS)
British Tamil Association
British Tamils Forum
Free Tibet
Global Tamil Forum
Kuki Inpi
Tamils Rehabilitation Organisation
World Uyghur Congress (WUC)

Countries

Australia

Kimberley Land Council (KLC)
Reconciliation Australia

Bolivia

Confederación de Pueblos Indígenas de Bolivia (CIDOB)
Consejo Nacional de Ayllus y Markas del Qullasuyu (CONAMAQ)

Botswana

First People of the Kalahari (FPK)

Brazil

Coordenação das Organizações Indígenas da Amazônia Brasileira (COIAB)

Canada

Assembly of First Nations (AFN)
Congress of Aboriginal Peoples (CAP)
National Association of Friendship Centres
Federation of Saskatchewan Indian Nations (FSIN)
Government of Nunavut
Inuit Tapiriit Kanatami (ITK)
Manitoba Métis Federation (MMF)
Métis National Council (MNC)
Mohawk Warrior Society
Native Women's Association of Canada (NWAC)
Nunavut Tunngavik Incorporated (NTI)
Pauktuutit
RAVEN (Respecting Aboriginal Values & Environmental Needs)

Colombia

Organización Nacional Indígena de Colombia (ONIC)

Chile

Coordinadora Arauco-Malleco (CAM)
Weichán Auka Mapu (WAM)

Ecuador

Confederación de Nacionalidades Indígenas del Ecuador (CONAIE)
Confederación de las Nacionalidades Indígenas de la Amazonia Ecuatoriana (CONFENIAE)
Confederación de Pueblos de la Nacionalidad Kichuas del Ecuador (ECUARUNARI)

India
Government of Andhra Pradesh
Government of Arunachal Pradesh
Government of Assam
Government of Karnataka
Government of Kerala
Government of Manipur
Government of Meghalaya
Government of Mizoram
Government of Nagaland
Government of Sikkim
Government of Tamil Nadu
Government of Telangana
Government of Tripura

Indonesia
 Yayasan Merah Putih (YMP)

Iraq
Kurdistan Regional Government (KRG)

Japan
Ainu Association of Hokkaido

Malaysia 

Department of Orang Asli Development (JAKOA)

Mexico

Popular Indigenous Council of Oaxaca "Ricardo Flores Magón" (CIPO-RFM)
Zapatista Army of National Liberation (EZLN)

Namibia

Namrights

Nigeria

Movement for the Survival of the Ogoni People (MOSOP)

Norway

Norske Samers Riksforbund (NSR)
Samenes Folkeforbund (People's Federation of the Saami)

Peru
Asociación Interétnica de Desarrollo de la Selva Peruana (AIDESEP)
Peru Support Group (PSG)

Russia
Association of Sámi in Murmansk Oblast
Government of Bashkortostan
Government of the Sakha Republic
Government of Tatarstan
Russian Association of Indigenous Peoples of the North (RAIPON)

Taiwan

Council of Indigenous Peoples

United States

Alaska Federation of Natives
American Indian Defense Association (AIDA)
Great Lakes Indian Fish & Wildlife Commission (GLIFWC)
Honor the Earth
Indigenous Environmental Network (IEN)
International Indian Treaty Council (IITC)
Inter-Tribal Environmental Council (ITEC)
National Congress of American Indians (NCAI)
National Indian Youth Council (NIYC)
Native American Rights Fund (NARF)
White Earth Land Recovery Project (WELRP)
Women's National Indian Association

Governmental

Regional
Africa
African Commission on Human and Peoples' Rights (ACHPR)
Arctic
Arctic Council
Australia
National Indigenous Australians Agency
National Native Title Tribunal
Brazil
Fundação Nacional do Índio (FUNAI)
Canada
Aboriginal Affairs and Northern Development Canada (AADNC)
China
State Ethnic Affairs Commission 
France
Ministry of the Overseas
India
Ministry of Development of North Eastern Region
Malaysia
Department of Orang Asli Development (JAKOA)
Mexico
Comisión Nacional para el Desarrollo de los Pueblos Indígenas (CDI)
New Zealand
Minister of Māori Affairs
Philippines
National Commission on Indigenous Peoples (NCIP)
Russia
Ministry for the Development of the Russian Far East and Arctic
South Africa
Department of Traditional Affairs
Sri Lanka
Ministry of National Languages and Social Integration 
United States
Bureau of Indian Affairs

International

United Nations Permanent Forum on Indigenous Issues (UNPFII)
Unrepresented Nations and Peoples Organization (UNPO)

See also
List of human rights organisations
List of ethnic organizations in the United States

Human rights-related lists
 
Lists of environmental organizations